Dettweiler refers to:

Surname 
Christian Dettweiler (1915–1995), German innovator in the field of graphology
Helen Dettweiler (1914–1990), American professional golfer

Place 
Dettwiller, a commune in Alsace, France, of which the German name is Dettweiler

See also 
Dätwyler
Detweiler
Detwiler